William Bernstein Schwartz Jr. (November 14, 1921 – May 18, 2010) was an American businessman who served as the United States Ambassador to the Bahamas from 1977 to 1981.

Schwartz died on May 18, 2010, in Atlanta, Georgia, at the age of 88.

References

1921 births
2010 deaths
Ambassadors of the United States to the Bahamas
Georgia (U.S. state) Democrats